The FC Enikon Augsburg was a German football club from Augsburg, Bavaria that was active from the late 70s until the mid-90s.

History
The club was formed in 1978 by Croatian migrants and languished in the lower leagues of the Schwaben football league system for most of its short existence. It climbed into higher-level competition through the financial support of Croatian construction company Enikon.

The team rose rapidly through the early 1990s, earning four consecutive promotions. A championship in the Bezirksliga Schwaben-Süd (VII) in 1992 advanced the side to the Bezirksoberliga Schwaben (VI). After finishing second there, they won promotion to the Landesliga Bayern-Süd (V) through the promotion play-off. Another second-place result and a successful promotion round with the other Landesliga runners-up gained the team entry to the Bayernliga (IV) for the 1994–95 season.

Enikon's primary objective was to one day play league games against the long established and well-known local side FC Augsburg. They narrowly missed that goal as FCA was promoted ahead of them to the Regionalliga Süd (III).

The club found competition in the Bayernliga to be more difficult and struggled for survival there. After a promising start in which Enikon won their first two matches of the season, the club quickly fell into the relegation zone. They finished in 16th place with a record of ten wins, nine draws and fifteen defeats and would have been immediately sent down if not for the withdrawal of 1. FC Amberg from the league allowing Enikon to take Amberg's spot in the relegation play-offs. They won their first round match over Alemannia Haibach (2:1), but were sent back down to Landesliga play after losing to SpVgg Weiden.

Disbanding of the club
As the club's Bayernliga campaign was coming to a close it became clear that sponsor Enikon could not continue its support and that without their financial backing the team could not afford to carry on in the upcoming season. The decision was made to withdraw and FC was disbanded after the 1994–95 season. A proposal to merge with TSG Augsburg to retain a Landesliga spot for an Augsburg team did not materialize as TSG were themselves struggling financially.

Legacy
Like many immigrant-based clubs in Germany, Enikon suffered from the lack of a home ground and training facilities throughout its existence, having to share facilities with other clubs in Augsburg.

The club was well recognized in the region for the technical skill of its players, who were mostly, but not exclusively, of Croatian origin. Support for this is found in the club's rapid rise, and its 1994 win in the Schwaben indoor football championship followed by a second-place result in the Bavarian championship. FC Enikon remains to this day the most successful non-Turkish migrant club in Bavaria.

Honours
The club's honours:

League
 Landesliga Bayern-Süd (IV)
 Runners up: 1994
 Bezirksoberliga Schwaben (V)
 Runners up: 1993
 Bezirksliga Schwaben-Süd (VI)
 Champions: 1992

Indoor
 Bavarian indoor football championship
 Runners up: 1994
 Schwaben indoor football championship
 Champions: 1994

References

Sources
Das Fussball Jahresjournal,  an annual publication by the Schwaben Football Association (SFV)

External links
 FC Enikon Augsburg at fussballdaten.de
   Das deutsche Fussball Archiv 

Football clubs in Germany
Defunct football clubs in Germany
Association football clubs established in 1978
Association football clubs disestablished in 1995
Defunct football clubs in Bavaria
FC Enikon
Football in Swabia (Bavaria)
1978 establishments in West Germany
1995 disestablishments in Germany
Migrant workers football clubs in Germany
Croatian sports clubs outside Croatia